A floating sheerleg (also: shearleg) is a floating water vessel with a crane built on shear legs. Unlike other types of crane vessel, it is not capable of rotating its crane independently of its hull.

There is a huge variety in sheerleg capacity. The smaller cranes start at around 50 tons in lifting capacity, with the largest being able to lift 10,000 tons. The bigger sheerlegs usually have their own propulsion system and have a large accommodation facility on board, while smaller units are floating pontoons that need to be towed to their workplace by tugboats.

Sheerlegs are commonly used for salvaging ships, assistance in shipbuilding, loading and unloading large cargo into ships, and bridge building. They have grown considerably larger over the last decades due to a marked increase in vessel, cargo, and component size (of ships, offshore oil rigs, and other large fabrications), resulting in heavier lifts both during construction and in salvage operations.

List of floating sheerlegs by lifting capacity 

Notes

References

Cranes (machines)
Crane vessels
Floating cranes
Individual cranes (machines)